The Bluestone River is a tributary of the New River, 77 mi (124 km) long, in southwestern Virginia and southern West Virginia in the United States.  Via the New, Kanawha and Ohio rivers, it is part of the watershed of the Mississippi River.  An 11 mi (18 km) portion of its lower course in West Virginia is designated as the Bluestone National Scenic River.

Course
The Bluestone rises on East River Mountain in Tazewell County, Virginia and flows generally northeastwardly through Mercer and Summers counties in West Virginia, passing the towns of Bluefield in Virginia and Bramwell and Montcalm in West Virginia.  It joins the New River about 4 mi (6.4 km) south of Hinton as part of Bluestone Lake, which is formed by a U.S. Army Corps of Engineers dam on the New.  The Bluestone's National Scenic River segment is located mostly in Summers County, as is Pipestem Resort State Park, which lies along a gorge formed by the river.

Pollution
The Bluestone has been compromised by PCB contamination, largely left over from former coal mining activities.  As a result of this contamination, Virginia does not recommend eating any carp in the upstream vicinity of Bluefield, Virginia. West Virginia recommends eating no more than one meal of carp per month.

In Virginia, the state Department of Environmental Quality does not recommend any contact recreation (such as swimming or wading) in the Bluestone due to high levels of fecal coliform bacteria.

Little Bluestone River
The Little Bluestone River is a minor tributary of the Bluestone in Summers County, fewer than 10 mi (15 km) in length from its formation by the confluence of two streams, White Oak Branch and Jumping Branch.

Variant names
According to the Geographic Names Information System, the Bluestone River has also been known as:
Big Bluestone River
Blue Stone Creek
Blue Stone River
Bluestone Creek
Native American names have included the following:
Mec-ce-ne-ke-ke-ce-pe-we
Mec-cen-ne-ke-ke
Mo-mom-ga-sen-eka-ce-pe

See also
List of Virginia rivers
List of West Virginia rivers
List of National Wild and Scenic Rivers

References

External links
Bluestone Lake website
Bluestone State Park website

Rivers of Virginia
Rivers of West Virginia
Rivers of Mercer County, West Virginia
Rivers of Summers County, West Virginia
Rivers of Tazewell County, Virginia
Tributaries of the New River (Kanawha River tributary)
Wild and Scenic Rivers of the United States